A7, A.7, A 7, A07 or A-7 may refer to:

Arts and entertainment

Music
 A7, the A dominant seventh chord used in many rock songs, see dominant seventh chord
 A (musical note)
 A7 (mixtape), by SCH, 2015
 Avenged Sevenfold, a hard rock/metal band

Radio stations
 Arutz Sheva, an Israeli radio station meaning Channel Seven

Electronics and software
 A7, a type of stereoautograph
 Altec Lansing A-7, a speaker
 Apple A7, a system on a chip used first in the iPhone 5S
 ARM Cortex-A7, a processor in the ARM Cortex-A processor family
 Samsung Galaxy A7, a smartphone
 Sony α7, a family of full-frame mirrorless interchangeable-lens cameras.

Military

Equipment
 A-7 (transceiver), a Soviet VHF radio transceiver developed during World War II
 Skoda 37 mm A7, a tank gun produced before and during World War II by the Skoda Works

Groups
 A7 (Artillery Regiment)
 A7, the military staff designation in the continental staff system for air force headquarters staff concerned with military training
 A 7, a Swedish artillery regiment

Vehicles
 A7, a model of German Aggregate Series Rocket from World War II
 A-7 Corsair II, a Ling-Temco-Vought single engine jet attack aircraft
 Antonov A-7, a World War II Soviet assault glider
 Breda A.7, a 1929 Italian reconnaissance aircraft
 Focke-Wulf A 7, a World War I German aircraft
 Hall-Scott A-7, an early aircraft engine
 , an A-class submarine of the Royal Navy
 , a.k.a. USS A-7, a Plunger-class submarine of the United States Navy

Science
 ATC code A07 Antidiarrheals, intestinal anti-inflammatory/anti-infective agents, a subgroup of the Anatomical Therapeutic Chemical Classification System
 British NVC community A7 (Nymphaea alba community), a British Isles plant community
 Noradrenergic cell group A7
 Subfamily A7, a Rhodopsin-like receptors subfamily

Sports
 A7 (classification), an amputee sport classification
 A type of Réti Opening code for Chess (A07)

Transportation

Companies
 Air Comet, its IATA airline designator
 Autobacs Seven, a Japanese sports car manufacturer

Automobiles
 Arrows A7, a British racing car
 Audi A7, a German mid-size coupe

Roads and routes
 A7 road, in several countries
 Route A7 (WMATA), a bus route operated by the Washington Metropolitan Area Transit Authority

Trains
 LNER Class A7, a class of British 4-6-2T steam locomotives

Other uses
 A7, an ISO 216, international standard paper size, 74×105 mm
 A7 (bar), bar in New York City

See also
 Alpha 7 (disambiguation) (α7 / Α7)